The Women's 5 kilometre cross-country skiing event was part of the cross-country skiing programme at the 1972 Winter Olympics, in Sapporo, Japan. It was the third appearance of the event. The competition was held on 9 February 1972, at the Makomanai Cross Country Events Site.

Results

References

Women's cross-country skiing at the 1972 Winter Olympics
Women's 5 kilometre cross-country skiing at the Winter Olympics
Oly
Cross